Shaikha Najlaa Mohammad Salem Al Qasimi (born 1970) is a United Arab Emirates diplomat who has served as the UAE's Ambassador to Sweden, Denmark, Finland, and Portugal.

Personal life

Al Qasimi has a Bachelor of Arts degree in Political Science from the United Arab Emirates University. She has an MSc and a PhD from Stockholm University.

Career
In, Al Qasimi joined HSBC bank in a graduate role. She later for the Emirates Center for Strategic Studies and Research. She began her political career in 2005 as a secretary. She worked at the European and American Affairs in Abu Dhabi, and a United Nations diplomat in Geneva, Switzerland. In 2008, Al Qasimi was appointed as the UAE ambassador to Sweden. Al Qasimi and Hissa Abdulla Ahmed Al-Otaiba were the first two female UAE ambassadors. At the time, there were 3,000 Emiratis in Sweden, and just 12 Emiratis in Stockholm, where the embassy is located. She later worked as the UAE ambassador to Finland and Denmark, before becoming UAE ambassador to Portugal.

Aside from her ambassadorial roles, Al Qasimi has been on the board of Women for Sustainable Growth and Women in International Security. She currently works as a lecturer at Zayed University in Dubai, UAE.

References

United Arab Emirates women ambassadors
Ambassadors of the United Arab Emirates to Sweden
Ambassadors of the United Arab Emirates to Finland
Ambassadors of the United Arab Emirates to Denmark
Ambassadors of the United Arab Emirates to Portugal
1970 births
Living people
United Arab Emirates University alumni
Stockholm University alumni
Academic staff of Zayed University